The single transferable vote (STV) is a voting system based on proportional representation and ranked voting. Under STV, an elector's vote is initially allocated to his or her most-preferred candidate. After candidates have been either elected (winners) by reaching quota or eliminated (losers), surplus votes are transferred from winners to remaining candidates (hopefuls) according to the surplus ballots' ordered preferences.

The system minimizes "wasted" votes and allows for approximately proportional representation without the use of party lists. A variety of algorithms (methods) carry out these transfers.

Voting
When using an STV ballot, the voter ranks the candidates on the ballot. For example:

Some, but not all single transferable vote systems require a preference to be expressed for every candidate.

Quota
The quota (sometimes called the threshold) is the number of votes that ensure the election of a candidate. Some may be elected without quota but any candidate who receives quota is elected.

The quota must be set high enough that the number of elected candidates cannot exceed the number of seats, but the lower it is, the more fair to parties - large and small - the election result will be.

The Hare quota and the Droop quota are the common types of quota.

Generally, quota is set based on the valid votes cast, and even if the number of votes in play decreases through the vote count process, the quota remains as set through the process.

Meek's counting method recomputes the quota on each iteration of the count, as described below.

Hare quota

When Thomas Hare originally conceived his version of single transferable vote, he envisioned using the quota:

The Hare quota is mathematically simple. It is the largest number of votes that allows enough to be elected to fill the open seats. But its large size means that some candidates may be eliminated earlier in the process, which may cause a degree of disproportionality that would be less likely with a lower quota, such as the Droop quota.

Droop quota

The most common quota formula is the Droop quota, which given as:

Droop produces a lower quota than Hare. If each ballot has a full list of preferences, Droop guarantees (if the Droop quota is no higher than the Hare quota) that every winner meets the quota rather than being elected as the last remaining candidate after lower candidates are eliminated. (But in real-life elections, where not all ballots bear full rankings, it is common even under Droop for one or two candidates to be elected with partial quota at the end, as the field of candidates is thinned to the number of remaining open seats.)

It is only necessary to allocate enough votes to ensure that no other candidate still in contention could win. This sometimes leaves nearly one quota's worth of votes held by unsuccessful candidates; these ballots are effectively ignored.  That is, relative to the Hare quota, ballots for the elected candidates with second-place preferences get the influence that would have gone to these ignored ballots.

Under Droop, a majority of the voters can be guaranteed to elect a majority of the seats when there is an odd number of seats.

Each winner's surplus votes transfer to other candidates according to their remaining preferences, using a formula (p/t)*s, where s is a number of surplus votes to be transferred, t is a total number of transferable votes (that have a second preference) and p is a number of second preferences for the given candidate.

Example 
Two seats need to be filled among four candidates: Andrea, Brad, Carter, and Delilah. 57 voters cast ballots with the following preference orderings:

In the first round, Andrea receives 40 votes and Delilah 17. Andrea is elected with 20 surplus votes. Ignoring how the votes are valued for this example, 20 votes are reallocated according to their second preferences. 12 of the reallocated votes go to Carter, 8 to Brad.

As none of the hopefuls have reached the quota, Brad, the candidate with the fewest votes, is excluded. All of his votes have Carter as the next-place choice, and are reallocated to Carter. This gives Carter 20 votes (quota) and he fills the second seat.

Thus:

Counting rules 
Until all seats have been filled, votes are successively transferred to one or more "hopeful" candidates (those who are not yet elected or eliminated) from two sources:
 Surplus votes (i.e. those in excess of the quota) of elected candidates.
 All votes of eliminated candidates.
(In either case, some votes may be non-transferable as they bear no marked back-up preferences for any non-elected, non-eliminated candidate.)

The possible algorithms for doing this differ in detail, e.g., in the order of the steps. There is no general agreement on which is best, and the choice of method used may affect the outcome.

 Compute the quota.
 Assign votes to candidates by first preferences.
 Declare as winners all candidates who have achieved at least the quota.
 Transfer the excess votes from winners, if any, to hopefuls.
 Repeat 3–4 until no new candidates are elected. (Under some systems, votes could initially be transferred in this step to prior winners or losers. This might affect the outcome.)
 If these steps result in all the seats being filled, the process is complete. Otherwise:
 Eliminate one or more candidates, typically either the lowest candidate or all candidates whose combined votes are less than the vote of the next highest candidate.
 Transfer the votes of the eliminated candidates to remaining hopeful candidates.
 Return to step 3 and go through the loop until all seats are filled.

Transfers of votes of eliminated candidates 
Transfers of votes of eliminated candidates is done simply, without the use of complex mathematics. The next usable back-up preference on the vote gives the destination for the transfer of the vote. If there is no usable preference on the ballot, the vote goes to the "exhausted" or non-transferable pile.

Surplus vote transfers 
To minimize wasted votes, surplus votes are transferred to other candidates if possible. The number of surplus votes is known; but none of the various allocation methods is universally preferred. Alternatives exist for deciding which votes to transfer, how to weight the transfers, who receives the votes and the order in which surpluses from two or more winners are transferred. Transfers are attempted when a candidate receives more votes than the quota. Excess votes are transferred to remaining candidates, where possible.

Non-transferable ballots are not transferred, and remain with the successful candidate.

Hare 
If the transfer is of surplus received in the first count, transfers are done in reference to all the votes held by the successful candidate.

If the transfer is of surplus received after the first count through transfer from another candidate, transfers are done in reference to all the votes held by the successful candidate or merely in reference to the most recent transfer received by the successful candidate.

Reallocation ballots are drawn at random from those most recently received. In a manual count of paper ballots, this is the easiest method to implement.

Votes are transferred as whole votes. Fractional votes are not used. 

This system is close to Thomas Hare's original 1857 proposal. It is used in elections in the Republic of Ireland to Dáil Éireann (the lower chamber), to local government, to the European Parliament, and to the university constituencies in Seanad Éireann (the upper chamber). 

This is sometimes described as "random" because it does not consider later back-up preferences but only the next usable one. Through random drawing of the votes to make up the transfer, statistically the transfers often reflect the make-up of the votes held by the successful candidate.

Sometimes, ballots of the elected candidate are manually mixed. In Cambridge, Massachusetts, votes are counted one precinct at a time, imposing a spurious ordering on the votes. To prevent all transferred ballots coming from the same precinct, every th ballot is selected, where  is the fraction to be selected.

Wright 
The Wright system is a reiterative linear counting process where on each candidate's exclusion the quota is reset and the votes recounted, distributing votes according to the voters' nominated order of preference, excluding candidates removed from the count as if they had not been nominated.

For each successful candidate that exceeds the quota threshold, calculate the ratio of that candidate's surplus votes (i.e., the excess over the quota) divided by the total number of votes for that candidate, including the value of previous transfers. Transfer that candidate's votes to each voter's next preferred hopeful. Increase the recipient's vote tally by the product of the ratio and the ballot's value as the previous transfer (1 for the initial count.)

Every preference continues to count until the choices on that ballot have been exhausted or the election is complete. Its main disadvantage is that given large numbers of votes, candidates and/or seats, counting is administratively burdensome for a manual count due to the number of interactions. This is not the case with the use of computerised distribution of preference votes.

From May 2011 to June 2011, The Proportional Representation Society of Australia reviewed the Wright System noting:

Hare-Clark 

This is a variation on the original Hare method that used "random" choices. It is used in Tasmanian and ACT lower house elections in Australia. It allows votes to the same ballots to be repeatedly transferred. The surplus value is calculated based on the allocation of preference of the last bundle transfer. The last bundle transfer method has been criticised as being inherently flawed in that only one segment of votes is used to transfer the value of surplus votes denying voters who contributed to a candidate's surplus a say in the surplus distribution. In the following explanation, Q is the quota required for election.

 Count the first preferences votes.
 Declare as winners those candidates whose total is at least Q.
 For each winner, compute surplus as total number of votes minus Q.
 For each winner, in order of descending surplus:
 Assign that winner's ballots to candidates according to each ballot's next preference, setting aside exhausted ballots.
 Calculate the ratio of surplus to the number of reassigned ballots or 1 if the number of such ballots is less than surplus.
 For each candidate, multiply ratio * the number of that candidate's reassigned votes and add the result (rounded down) to the candidate's tally.
 Repeat 3–5 until winners fill all seats, or all ballots are exhausted.
 If more winners are needed, declare a loser the candidate with the fewest votes, and reassign that candidate's ballots according to each ballot's next preference.

Example: If Q is 200 and a winner has 272 first-choice votes, of which 92 have no other hopeful listed, surplus is 72, ratio is 72/(272−92) or 0.4. If 75 of the reassigned 180 ballots have hopeful X as their second-choice, then the votes X receives is 0.4*75 or 30. If X had 190 votes, then X becomes a winner, with a surplus of 20 for the next round, if needed.

Gregory 
Another method, known as Senatorial rules (after its use for most seats in Irish Senate elections), or the Gregory method (after its inventor in 1880, J. B. Gregory of Melbourne) eliminates all randomness. Instead of transferring a fraction of votes at full value, transfer all votes at a fractional value.

In the Republic of Ireland, the Gregory Method is used for elections to the 43 seats on the vocational panels in Seanad Éireann, whose franchise is restricted to 949 members of local authorities and members of the Oireachtas (the Irish Parliament). In Northern Ireland, the Gregory Method has been used since 1973 for all STV elections, with up to 7 fractional transfers (in 8-seat district council elections), and up to 700,000 votes counted (in 3-seat European Parliament elections for the Northern Ireland constituency from 1979 to 2020).

An alternative means of expressing Gregory in calculating the Surplus Transfer Value applied to each vote is

The Unweighted Inclusive Gregory Method is used for the Australian Senate.

Transfer using a party-list allocation method

The effect of the Gregory system can be replicated without using fractional values by a party-list proportional allocation method, such as D'Hondt, Webster/Sainte-Laguë or Hare-Niemeyer. A party-list proportional representation electoral system allocates a share of the seats in a legislature to a political party in proportion to its share of the votes, a task which is mathematically equivalent to establishing a share of surplus votes to be transferred to a hopeful candidate based on the overall vote for an eliminated candidate.

Example: If the quota is 200 and a winner has 272 first-choice votes, then the surplus is 72 votes. If 92 of the winner's 272 votes have no other hopeful listed, then the remaining 180 votes have a second-choice selection and can be transferred.

Of the 180 votes which can be transferred, 75 have hopeful X as their second-choice, 43 have hopeful Y as their second-choice, and 62 have hopeful Z as their second-choice. The D'Hondt system is applied to determine how the surplus votes would be transferred - successive quotients are calculated for each hopeful candidate, one surplus vote is transferred to the hopeful candidate with the largest quotient, and the hopeful candidate's quotient is recalculated; this is repeated until all surplus votes have been transferred.

As a result of this process, 30 surplus votes have been transferred to hopeful X, 17 to hopeful Y, and 25 to hopeful Z.

Secondary preferences for prior winners
Suppose a ballot is to be transferred and its next preference is for a winner in a prior round. Hare and Gregory ignore such preferences and transfer the ballot to the next usable marked preference if any.

In other systems, the vote could be transferred to that winner and the process continued. For example, a prior winner X could receive 20 transfers from second round winner Y. Then select 20 at random from the 220 for transfer from X. However, some of these 20 ballots may then transfer back from X to Y, creating recursion. In the case of the Senatorial rules, since all votes are transferred at all stages, the recursion is infinite, with ever-decreasing fractions. Applying a party-list allocation method solves this infinite recursion, as the proportions are always applied as whole numbers on a positive integer surplus.

Meek
In 1969, B. L. Meek devised a vote counting algorithm based on Senatorial (Gregory) vote counting rules. The Meek algorithm uses an iterative approximation to short-circuit the infinite recursion that results when there are secondary preferences for prior winners. This system is currently used for some local elections in New Zealand, and for elections of moderators on some internet websites, e.g. Stack Exchange Network portals.

All candidates are allocated one of three statuses – Hopeful, Elected, or Excluded. Hopeful is the default. Each status has a weighting, or keep value, which is the fraction of the vote a candidate will receive for any preferences allocated to them while holding that status.

The weightings are:

Thus, if a candidate is Hopeful they retain the whole of the remaining preferences allocated to them, and subsequent preferences are worth 0.

If a candidate is Elected they retain the portion of the value of the preferences allocated to them that is the value of their weighting; the remainder is passed fractionally to subsequent preferences depending on their weighting. From this ballot A will retain , B will retain , C will retain , and D will retain .

If no candidate on a ballot has a weight of 1 then the sum total retained by the candidates on the ballot will be strictly less than 1.  The amount by which 1 exceeds the ballot's total is called the "excess", and the total excess from all ballots is disposed of by altering the quota. Meek's method is the only method to change quota mid-process. The quota is found by

a variation on Droop. This has the effect of also altering the weighting for each candidate.

This process continues until all the Elected candidates' vote values closely match the quota (plus or minus 0.0001%).

Warren
In 1994, C. H. E. Warren proposed another method of passing surplus to previously-elected candidates. Warren is identical to Meek except in the numbers of votes retained by winners. Under Warren, rather than retaining that proportion of each vote's value given by multiplying the weighting by the vote's value, the candidate retains that amount of a whole vote given by the weighting, or else whatever remains of the vote's value if that is less than the weighting.

Consider again a ballot with top preferences A, B, C, and D where the weightings are a, b, c, and d. Under Warren's method, A will retain , B will retain , C will retain , and D will retain .

Because candidates receive different values of votes, the weightings determined by Warren are in general different from Meek.

Under Warren, every vote that contributes to a candidate contributes, as far as it is able, the same portion as every other such vote.

Distribution of excluded candidate preferences
The method used in determining the order of exclusion and distribution of a candidates' votes can affect the outcome. Multiple methods are in common use for determining the order polyexclusion and distribution of ballots from a loser. Most systems (with the exception of an iterative count) were designed for manual counting processes and can produce different outcomes.

The general principle that applies to each method is to exclude the candidate that has the lowest tally. Systems must handle ties for the lowest tally. Alternatives include excluding the candidate with the lowest score in the previous round and choosing by lot.

Exclusion methods commonly in use:

 Single transaction—Transfer all votes for a loser in a single transaction without segmentation.
 Segmented distribution—Split distributed ballots into small, segmented transactions. Consider each segment a complete transaction, including checking for candidates who have reached quota. Generally, a smaller number and value of votes per segment reduces the likelihood of affecting the outcome.
 Value based segmentation—Each segment includes all ballots that have the same value.
 Aggregated primary vote and value segmentation—Separate the Primary vote (full-value votes) to reduce distortion and limit the subsequent value of a transfer from a candidate elected as result of a segmented transfer.
 FIFO (First In First Out – Last bundle)—Distribute each parcel in the order in which it was received. This method produces the smallest size and impact of each segment at the cost of requiring more steps to complete a count.
 Iterative count—After excluding a loser, reallocate the loser's ballots and restart the count. An iterative count treats each ballot as though that loser had not stood. Ballots can be allocated to prior winners using a segmented distribution process. Surplus votes are distributed only within each iteration. Iterative counts are usually automated to reduce costs. The number of iterations can be limited by applying a method of Bulk Exclusion.

Bulk exclusions
Bulk exclusion rules can reduce the number of steps required within a count. Bulk exclusion requires the calculation of breakpoints. Any candidates with a tally less than a breakpoint can be included in a bulk exclusion process provided the value of the associated running sum is not greater than the difference between the total value of the highest hopeful's tally and the quota.

To determine a breakpoint, list in descending order each candidates' tally and calculate the running tally of all candidates' votes that are less than the associated candidates tally.
The four types are:

 Quota breakpoint—The highest running total value that is less than half of the Quota
 Running breakpoint—The highest candidate's tally that is less than the associated running total
 Group breakpoint—The highest candidate's tally in a Group that is less than the associated running total of Group candidates whose tally is less than the associated Candidate's tally. (This only applies where there are defined groups of candidates such as in Australian public elections, which use an above-the-line group voting method.)
 Applied breakpoint—The highest running total that is less than the difference between the highest candidate's tally and the quota (i.e. the tally of lower-scoring candidates votes does not affect the outcome). All candidates above an applied breakpoint continue in the next iteration.

Quota breakpoints may not apply with optional preferential ballots or if more than one seat is open. Candidates above the applied breakpoint should not be included in a bulk exclusion process unless it is an adjacent quota or running breakpoint (see 2007 Tasmanian Senate count example below).

Example
Quota breakpoint (based on the 2007 Queensland Senate election results just prior to the first exclusion):

Running breakpoint (based on the 2007 Tasmanian Senate election results just prior to the first exclusion):

See also 
 Hagenbach-Bischoff quota
 Imperiali quota
 IRV implementations in United States#Independence Party of Minnesota (2004 Presidential poll)
 Voting matters, journal comparing and critiquing actual and theoretical varieties of STV and related voting systems.

References

External links 
 Fair vote – US campaign for electoral reform.
 Quota Notes – Proportional Representation Society of Australia.
 Australian Electoral Commission Web site.
 Algorithm 123 — Single Transferable Vote by Meek's Method
 OpenSTV – software for computing the single transferable vote
 Irish Proportional Representation System
 Banbridge Council election results giving detailed breakdowns of fractional transfers, illustrating Senatorial Rules.
  How to count votes under Meek's method - New Zealand legislation
 Animated presentation of how Meek's method is used to count votes in New Zealand STV
 Movable vote workshop tallies STV and related rules.

Single transferable vote
Vote counting